Tulipa kolpakowskiana, or Kolpakowsky's tulip, is a species of tulip native to Afghanistan, Kazakhstan, Kyrgyzstan, and Xinjiang in China. Its petals display a floral iridescence which is perceived by bumblebees. It has gained the Royal Horticultural Society's Award of Garden Merit.

References

kolpakowskiana
Flora of Afghanistan
Flora of Kazakhstan
Flora of Kyrgyzstan
Flora of Xinjiang
Plants described in 1877